Benjamin Robert Hanowski (born October 18, 1990) is an American professional ice hockey player who is currently under contract to Kölner Haie in the Deutsche Eishockey Liga (DEL). An alumnus of the St. Cloud State Huskies, he was a third round selection of the Pittsburgh Penguins, 63rd overall, at the 2009 NHL Entry Draft. Hanowski was dealt to the Calgary Flames prior to turning professional as part of the trade that sent Jarome Iginla to Pittsburgh. He made his NHL debut late in the 2012–13 season, scoring his first goal in his first game.

Early life
Hanowski grew up in Little Falls, Minnesota, where he played both baseball and ice hockey for Little Falls High School, graduating in 2009. He is the all-time leading scorer in Minnesota High School ice hockey history, recording 405 points in 117 games. He was a finalist for the Minnesota Mr. Hockey award, and named Minnesota Player of the Year by the Associated Press in 2008–09 following a season in which he scored 73 goals and 62 assists in 31 games. He was selected by the Pittsburgh Penguins in the third round of the 2009 NHL Entry Draft, 63rd overall. Prior to embarking on a professional career, Hanowksi attended St. Cloud State University first as a business major before switching to finance.

Playing career

College
Hanowski played four years for the St. Cloud State Huskies (SCSU), completing his college career with 62 goals and 51 assists for 113 points in 156 games. He was named the Western Collegiate Hockey Association (WCHA) scholar athlete in 2012, and was named to the all-WCHA Academic team twice. He began his college career in 2009–10, scoring his first two goals on October 23, 2009, against the Minnesota-Duluth Bulldogs en route to a 19-point season.

Following a sophomore season in which he scored 20 points, Hanowski was named one of three captains for the 2011–12 campaign. He led the team with 128 shots, 23 goals and 43 points. Hanowski returned for his senior season in 2012–13 as co-captain with Drew LeBlanc, finishing the year with 37 points in 31 games and a semifinal appearance in the 2013 national championship.

Professional
Hanowski's NHL rights were traded late in his senior season as the Penguins dealt him to the Calgary Flames along with Kenny Agostino and a first round draft pick in exchange for Calgary captain Jarome Iginla. Hanowski struggled to explain his place in the blockbuster deal: "I don't know how to describe it, being part of a trade for a future Hall of Famer. It was kind of weird to see yourself be part of that deal". Immediately following SCSU's elimination from the 2013 Frozen Four and the conclusion of his college season, Hanowski signed a two-year entry level contract with the Flames worth $810,000 per season. He made his NHL debut on April 15, 2013, in Calgary against his hometown Minnesota Wild, and scored his first goal in a 4–3 loss.

As a free agent from the Flames and with little interest from fellow NHL organizations, Hanowski signed a one-year contract with German club, Augsburger Panther of the DEL on September 7, 2015. He eventually stayed until the end of the 2016–17 season and then headed to fellow DEL outfit, Kölner Haie, putting pen to paper on a one-year deal in April 2017.

Career statistics

References

External links
 

1990 births
Living people
Abbotsford Heat players
Adirondack Flames players
American men's ice hockey right wingers
Augsburger Panther players
Calgary Flames players
Kölner Haie players
Ice hockey players from Minnesota
People from Little Falls, Minnesota
Pittsburgh Penguins draft picks
St. Cloud State Huskies men's ice hockey players